is a railway station on the Kintetsu Osaka Line in Kashiwara, Osaka Prefecture, Japan.

Layout
Kawachi-Kokubu Station has two island platforms serving two tracks each.

train time table 
The general train of the following express stops, and semi express from Osaka direction stops at all stations from this station to Nabari station.

It is one of the train station of the Osaka line, and there are frequent train overtaking and a connection. The daytime time period is 3 Express/h, the suburban semi-Express local Express is 3/h, and the Local train is 1/h.

Platforms

Surroundings
Japan National Route 25
Japan National Route 165
Kansai University of Welfare Sciences
Kashiwara City Kokubu Elementary School
Kashiwara City Kokubu Junior High School
Kashiwara City Tamateyama Park
Takaida Station (JR West Kansai Line (Yamatoji Line)) (across the Yamato River)
Domyoji Station (Minami Osaka Line)

Bus
Kashiwara Loop Bus "Kirameki" (free, on weekdays)
for Kashiwara City Hall and Karindo-Obata

Adjacent stations

References

Railway stations in Japan opened in 1927
Railway stations in Osaka Prefecture